Cascioli is an Italian surname. Notable people with the surname include:

 Cristiana Cascioli (born 1975), Italian fencer
 Gianluca Cascioli (born 1979), Italian pianist, conductor, and composer

See also
 Caccioli
 Cassioli

Italian-language surnames